Toxicology and Applied Pharmacology is a scientific journal for original research pertaining to action of chemicals, drugs, or natural products to animals or humans. The journal covers mechanistic approaches to physiological, biochemical, cellular, or molecular understanding of toxicologic/pathologic lesions and to methods used to describe these responses.

Indexing 
The journal is included in the Index Medicus and in MEDLINE.

According to the Journal Citation Reports, Toxicology and Applied Pharmacology has a 2020 impact factor of 4.219, ranking it 29 out of 93 in the category Toxicology.

References

External links 
 Elsevier

Monthly journals
Elsevier academic journals
English-language journals
Toxicology journals
Pharmacology journals